David Karanka de la Hoz (born 20 April 1978) is a Spanish former professional footballer who played as a striker.

He made 39 La Liga appearances over three seasons, scoring eight goals for Athletic Bilbao and Murcia. He added 141 matches and 29 goals in the Segunda División, in a 16-year senior career.

Club career
Karanka was born in Vitoria-Gasteiz, Álava. The younger brother of Athletic Bilbao, Real Madrid and Colorado Rapids player Aitor Karanka, he came up through the ranks of the Basque giants, and first appeared with the first team on 14 May 2000, playing 15 minutes in a 0–0 La Liga away draw against RCD Espanyol.

After a loan stint to CF Extremadura in 2000–01, where he scored 13 Segunda División goals, Karanka returned to Athletic, with virtually no impact (six games, although he scored once in a 3–2 thriller win at RC Celta de Vigo, as Bilbao trailed 0–2 with eight minutes remaining). He subsequently returned to the second tier, helping Real Murcia achieve promotion in 2002–03 by netting 13 goals, and adding seven in next season's top flight – already as a permanent player after having been bought outright for €180,000– as the club returned to where it came from.

After three years, Karanka was transferred to fellow league side Sporting de Gijón, where his form deteriorated, scoring only twice in 33 matches over two complete seasons. In January 2008 he joined Real Unión in Irun, moving in August to another Segunda División B team, UE Sant Andreu.

Karanka split the 2009–10 campaign between CD Guijuelo and Orihuela CF also in division three, totalling just three goals. Aged 32, he dropped down to the Tercera División and signed for CD Cieza.

Karanka went on to work as an assistant manager, starting out at Murcia then joining Nottingham Forest in July 2018. At the second of those clubs and the next, Birmingham City also of the English Championship, he worked under his brother Aitor.

Honours
Basconia
Tercera División: 1997–98

Murcia
Segunda División: 2002–03

References

External links

1978 births
Living people
Spanish footballers
Footballers from Vitoria-Gasteiz
Association football forwards
La Liga players
Segunda División players
Segunda División B players
Tercera División players
CD Basconia footballers
Bilbao Athletic footballers
Athletic Bilbao footballers
CF Extremadura footballers
Real Murcia players
Sporting de Gijón players
Real Unión footballers
UE Sant Andreu footballers
CD Guijuelo footballers
Orihuela CF players
CD Cieza players
Basque Country international footballers
Nottingham Forest F.C. non-playing staff
Birmingham City F.C. non-playing staff
Spanish expatriate sportspeople in England